Governance Commission for Government-owned or Controlled Corporations (GCC) is a government agency of the Philippines. It is the central policy-making, advisory, and regulatory body in regards to the operations and management of state-owned companies, designated as Government-owned and controlled corporations (GOCCs). The GCC is led by a chairman.

References

 
Business in the Philippines
Government agencies of the Philippines
2011 establishments in the Philippines